Hanoimilk JSC (HASTC:HNM) is a food company in Vietnam, producing mainly milk and dairy products, as well as working in animal husbandry and agriculture.  It is located in Vĩnh Phúc in the Red River Delta in north Vietnam, and is listed on the Hanoi Securities Trading Center.

See also
 Dairy cattle
 Dairy farming
 Milk

References

External links
Hanoimilk official site
Google finance, Hanoimilk JSC

Food and drink companies of Vietnam
Companies listed on the Hanoi Stock Exchange